Beatty Lake is a lake in Sibley County, in the U.S. state of Minnesota.

Beatty Lake was named for Robert Beatty, an early Irish settler and afterward state legislator.

References

Lakes of Minnesota
Lakes of Sibley County, Minnesota